Mitchell James Krenk (born November 19, 1959) is a former American football tight end for the Chicago Bears of the NFL. He earned a Super Bowl ring for spending the 1985 Bears season on injured reserve.

He attended University of Nebraska.

References

1959 births
Living people
American football tight ends
Nebraska Cornhuskers football players
Chicago Bears players
Players of American football from Nebraska
People from Crete, Nebraska